Nicola Teresa DeMartino and Gabriella Nelida DeMartino (born May 5, 1995), known professionally as Niki and Gabi, are an American twin duo of singers, social media influencers, YouTubers and actresses. In 2018, the duo released their debut extended play, Individual, and won a Streamy Award in the category of fashion. 

The duo are also active as solo musicians, Gabi was the first member to start her solo career, she released her debut single "Ever After" in 2016 and her debut extended play, Gabroadway, was released in 2020 ahead of her 2022 debut studio album, Paintings of Me. Niki's debut single "Let It Roar" was released in 2018 and her debut extended play, Nights Alone, was released in 2021.

Career
Niki and Gabi are twin sisters. They attended Notre Dame High School in Easton, Pennsylvania and then DeSales University in Center Valley, Pennsylvania, where Niki majored in television and film and Gabi majored in musical theatre. They dropped out of college after their junior year.

They initially produced comedy skits on their YouTube channel 00RemakeGirls. They later started a new channel, Niki and Gabi Beauty, for beauty, fashion and lifestyle themed videos. They signed with AwesomenessTV and StyleHaul in 2012. A cover of "Friday" by Rebecca Black in 2013 helped launch their YouTube career. They released their debut single "We're Not Over" on June 21, 2014, which however was taken down from streaming platforms along with their second single "It" that was released in June 2015.

Niki and Gabi were cast in the YouTube Red comedy-drama web film Dance Camp as the characters of Mia and Mya respectively. Gabi released her debut solo single "Ever After" in July 2016. In January 2017, Niki and Gabi released their official debut single after removing their past two singles, called "First". In August 2017, they released the lead single off of their debut EP, called "RU". Niki was cast as Sadie in season 2 of the Hulu horror web television series Freakish. Blood Queens, a horror-comedy YouTube web series created by Gabi, premiered in October 2017 and has run for four seasons from 2017 to 2020. On June 4, 2018, Wet Seal collaborated with Niki and Gabi and launched a limited edition clothing called "Niki + Gabi for Wet Seal". The collection included everything from accessories and tops to dresses. In June 2018, they released the second single from their debut EP, called "Sleep It Off". Next month, they released their debut extended play, Individual, on 27 July 2018. It charted at number 14 on the Heatseekers Albums chart and number 32 on the Independent Albums chart. The EP contains two solo singles from the duo which are Niki's debut single "Let It Roar" and Gabi's second single "Flowers". In September 2018, Gabi was featured on Mina Tobias' track "Another One" with Kai Lucas, the same month, she released her single titled "Yacht". In the same month, Gabi appeared in the music video for Thank U, Next by Ariana Grande. Niki and Gabi signed to Abrams Artists Agency in 2019. In February 2019, Gabi released her valentine single, "Cold Room", which was written in 2016. In August 2019, Niki and Gabi released their comeback single, "Hair Tie". In December 2019, Niki released "Sad Holiday" as her first Christmas single.

Gabi released her debut extended play, Gabroadway, in June 2020, contains 3 covers and a medley. Niki released the lead single from her debut extended play, "Alone in My Car", in August 2020 followed by the second single, "Bite of Me", in October 2020. Gabi released her single, "Champagne Dreams" in September 2020, which was intended to be the lead single from her debut album then-titled Beautiful Mess. The official lead single "Pretty Little Mind" was later released in October 2020. After taking a break from YouTube in late November 2020, Niki and Gabi returned in March 2021 to their collaborative channel. And Niki released her single "Messy Room". On May 15, 2021, Niki and Gabi launched their Snapchat reality series, Twinning Out. In 2021, Niki gave an interview for Vanity Teen magazine, following her third single "Messy Room", talking about her musical career and social influence. In June 2021, Niki released her single "25" as the fourth single from her debut extended play. In August 2021, Gabi released the second single "Not Today" off of her debut studio album, and was the opening act for Russian-German DJ Zedd at his concert in Musikfest. The same month, Pumpkin & Spice partnered with Gabi and launched their skincare line. On September 3rd 2021, Niki released her debut extended play, Nights Alone. In October 2021, Gabi released the single "Immaculate" describing it as her 'cancel culture anthem'. In December 2021, Gabi released a Christmas single titled "Barbie and Ken" featuring Kenny Screven. In February 2022, Niki released a single titled "9 Lives". On April 21st Niki released “When My High Wears Off”. Gabi released her debut studio album Paintings of Me on May 6, 2022.

Controversies
In September 2019, Niki and Gabi released a video on their channel titled "Going to College Dressed as Celebrities Challenge" in which American singer Normani was portrayed by a man. The video was criticized for "furthering stereotypes about black women having masculine features".

In March 2020, Niki posted a TikTok in wake of the COVID-19 pandemic which showed her with an Asian manicurist, both masked, while the song "It's Corona Time" plays over the video. The TikTok was criticized as racist and insensitive due to the implication that the manicurist had COVID-19 amid the rising xenophobia and racism experienced by Asians in the United States during the pandemic. The video was deleted and she issued an apology.

In September 2020, Gabi was criticized for a video titled "BFF Income Challenge" in which she was accused of flaunting her income. In the video, she compared her spending income with a friend revealing a "spending disparity of thousands of dollars per week". She later issued an apology.

In December 2020, Gabi made a nude video of herself at the age of 3 available for sale for $3 on the content subscription platform OnlyFans. She was accused of duping her fans about the contents of her video which was teased with the caption "won't put my panties on", distributing child pornography and setting up unsuspecting purchasers for felony possession of child pornography. OnlyFans suspended her account for violating their terms of service. Gabi initially attempted to downplay the incident as "trolling", stating to Insider, "Drama channels are trying to make something out of a childhood video of me, that's hilarious", and claiming her OnlyFans "was not a sexual page", though her previous posts were sexual in nature. She later posted a 1 minute apology video to her YouTube channel.

Reality web series
The duo star in their own reality web series, Niki and Gabi, by AwesomenessTV. It has run for five seasons.

Discography

Extended plays

Singles

Solo discography

Albums

Extended plays

Singles

Filmography

 Wheel Of Fashion (2015-2016, AwesomenssTV, YouTube)
 DIY Or DI-Don't (2015-2017, AwesomenssTV, YouTube)
 Teen Choice Awards (2015, Fox)
 YouTubers React (2016, React, YouTube)
 Top Five Live (2016, AwesomenssTV, YouTube)
 Niki and Gabi (2017-2020, AwesomenssTV, YouTube)
 Dear DeMartino (2018, AwesomenssTV, YouTube)
 Twinning Out (2021, Snapchat)

Awards and nominations

References 

American YouTubers
American twins
1995 births
YouTube channels launched in 2012
Living people
American musical duos
American people of Cuban descent
American people of Italian descent
21st-century American singers
Social media influencers
Notre Dame High School (Easton, Pennsylvania) alumni
Twin musical duos